The following events occurred in June 1926:

Tuesday, June 1, 1926
Princess Elizabeth of England was christened in the private chapel of Buckingham Palace.

Born: 
Marilyn Monroe, American actress, model and singer, in Los Angeles (d. 1962)
Andy Griffith, American actor, singer and writer, in Mount Airy, North Carolina (d. 2012)

Wednesday, June 2, 1926
Jonas Staugaitis was elected head of the Seimas in Lithuania.

Thursday, June 3, 1926
The best-selling British book The Diary of a Young Lady of Fashion in the Year 1764–1765 by Cleone Knox, supposedly an eighteenth-century diary unearthed and published for the first time in 1925, was exposed as a hoax. Magdalen King-Hall, the young daughter of Admiral Sir George Fowler King-Hall, was revealed to be the real author. "I wrote the book in a few weeks, but if I had realized so many distinguished people would have taken it seriously, I should have spent much more time and pains on it", King-Hall stated.
Born: 
Allen Ginsberg, leftist American poet associated with the Beat Generation; in Newark, New Jersey (d. 1997)
Roscoe Bartlett, conservative U.S. Congressman for Maryland; in Moorland, Kentucky (alive in 2021)

Friday, June 4, 1926

Ignacy Mościcki became President of the Republic of Poland.  He would serve until 1939, fleeing Poland when Germany and the Soviet Union invaded to start World War II.
The United States Congress passed a resolution requesting that President Calvin Coolidge issue a proclamation calling for the annual observance of Armistice Day with "appropriate ceremonies." Although twenty-seven U.S. states had already established November 11 as a legal holiday, Veterans Day did not become a legal Federal holiday until 1938.
The Australian film The Pioneers opened in Sydney.
Died: Fred Spofforth, 72, Australian cricketer

Saturday, June 5, 1926
Britain and Turkey signed the Anglo-Turkish Agreement on Mosul, an accord over disputed territory between the two countries in the Mosul region.

Sunday, June 6, 1926
The Old Social Democratic Party of Germany, a splinter faction of the Social Democratic Party of Germany (SPD), was formally constituted.
The films Ella Cinders and A Trip to Chinatown premiered.
Born: Klaus Tennstedt, German composer, in Merseburg (d. 1998)

Monday, June 7, 1926

Kazys Grinius was elected President of Lithuania by the Third Seimas.
The League of Nations opened its fortieth council session in Geneva. Brazil boycotted the session in protest of its being denied a seat on the permanent council.

Tuesday, June 8, 1926
Babe Ruth hit one of the longest home runs of his career at Navin Field in Detroit, over the right field stands and into the street a block away. Sportswriters at the game reported that the ball carried over 600 feet, although whether it actually did or not cannot be proven.
Died: Emily Hobhouse, 66, British welfare campaigner

Wednesday, June 9, 1926
The Soviet Union passed a law forbidding the export of Soviet currency abroad.
Died: Sanford B. Dole, 82, President of Hawaii and 1st Territorial Governor of Hawaii

Thursday, June 10, 1926
Spain threatened to quit the League of Nations if it was not granted a permanent seat.
The Treaty of Friendship between France and Romania was signed in Paris. Although a diplomatic victory for Romanian Prime Minister Alexandru Averescu, it had little actual value since it did not commit France to lend direct military assistance in the event of war between Romania and the Soviet Union.
Born: Lionel Jeffries, British actor and director, in Forest Hill, London (d. 2010)
Died: Antoni Gaudí, 73, Catalonian architect

Friday, June 11, 1926
Brazil announced it would leave the League of Nations.
Born: Frank Plicka, Czech photographer, in Kladno, Czechoslovakia (d. 2010)

Saturday, June 12, 1926
A monument to the actress Sarah Bernhardt by the sculptor François-Léon Sicard was unveiled in Paris near the house where she died in 1923.
Born: Gaspare di Mercurio, Italian author, in Partinico (d. 2001)

Sunday, June 13, 1926
A memorial to the Spartacist leaders Rosa Luxemburg and Karl Liebknecht, designed by Ludwig Mies van der Rohe for Berlin's Friedrichsfelde Central Cemetery, was inaugurated.
Born: Paul Lynde, American comedian; in Mount Vernon, Ohio (d. 1982)
Died: Gottfried Lindauer, 87, Bohemian-born New Zealand painter

Monday, June 14, 1926
Socialists in Berlin held a mass demonstration outside the City Palace, supporting an affirmative vote in the upcoming referendum on whether to expropriate the property of the former ruling houses of Germany. About 50 were wounded and 100 arrested in fighting that broke out as police attempted to confiscate an effigy of Wilhelm II.
Born: Don Newcombe, American baseball player, in Madison, New Jersey (d. 2019)
Died: Mary Cassatt, 82, American artist

Tuesday, June 15, 1926
The World Court opened its eleventh session at The Hague.
The British ballet A Tragedy of Fashion was first performed.
Born: Shigeru Kayano, Ainu activist, in Nibutani, Japan (d. 2006)

Wednesday, June 16, 1926
Aurelio Padovani, an early Fascist leader who had fallen out of favour with Mussolini, was killed mysteriously along with eight others when the balcony of Padovani's home in Naples collapsed as he stepped out to greet a throng of admirers below.
Ziya Hurşit, former deputy in the Grand National Assembly of Turkey, was arrested for planning to assassinate President Mustafa Kemal Atatürk.
Born: William F. Roemer, Jr., U.S. FBI agent (d. 1996) 
Died: Aurelio Padovani, 37, Italian Fascist leader, was killed in the collapse of a balcony at his home, along with eight other people.

Thursday, June 17, 1926
The Seventh Street Bridge (now the Andy Warhol Bridge) opened in Pittsburgh.

Friday, June 18, 1926
Australia passed amendments to the 1904 Conciliation and Arbitration Act, granting wider powers to judges.
Born: Allan Sandage, American astronomer, in Iowa City, Iowa (d. 2010)

Saturday, June 19, 1926
DeFord Bailey became the first African-American to perform on Nashville's Grand Ole Opry.

Sunday, June 20, 1926
The German referendum to expropriate the property of the former ruling houses received a 96.1% vote in favour, but failed to pass into law because the 39% voter turnout was too low.
Three memorial services were held for Christian evangelist Aimee Semple McPherson, missing since May 18, to accommodate the 17,000 people who wished to pay their final respects along with millions of listeners who tuned in to the services on the radio. 
The 28th International Eucharistic Congress opened in Chicago, with over 250,000 spectators attending the opening procession.

Monday, June 21, 1926
U.S. President Calvin Coolidge announced a government surplus of $390 million for the fiscal year ending June 30.
Born: Conrad Hall, American cinematographer, in Papeete, Tahiti (d. 2003)

Tuesday, June 22, 1926
The St. Louis Cardinals purchased the contract of pitcher Grover Cleveland Alexander from the Chicago Cubs.

Wednesday, June 23, 1926

Aimee Semple McPherson was found stumbling in the desert of Agua Prieta, Mexico just south of Douglas, Arizona. McPherson claimed she had been kidnapped, drugged, tortured and held for ransom, but had escaped.
Aristide Briand formed his tenth Cabinet in France. Joseph Caillaux took over as Minister of Finance.

Thursday, June 24, 1926
U.S. Congress created the position of Assistant Secretary of the Navy for Aeronautics to oversee the United States' naval aviation forces. The navy's five-year plan for aviation was also passed.
Lightning storms and flooding in northern and central Germany killed 10 and destroyed many crops. 
Thousands were left homeless by flooding in Guanajuato, Mexico.

Friday, June 25, 1926
Hundreds were reported dead from the flooding in León, Guanajuato, Mexico as irrigation dams broke overnight. 
Golfer Bobby Jones won the British Open.
Freddie Spruell became the first Delta blues musician to be recorded when he cut "Milk Cow Blues" in Chicago.
Born: Ingeborg Bachmann, Austrian poet and author, in Klagenfurt (d. 1973)

Saturday, June 26, 1926
Canadian Prime Minister William Lyon Mackenzie King, on the verge of losing an effective motion of censure in the Commons, had the debate adjourned so he could request a dissolution of Parliament.  
French Minister of Finance Joseph Caillaux had the Governor of the Banque de France, Georges Robineau, ousted and replaced by Émile Moreau. Robineau had refused to allow France's gold reserves to be used to help stop the devaluation of the franc.

Sunday, June 27, 1926
Jules Goux of France won the 1926 French Grand Prix.
The films Miss Nobody and The Gentle Cyclone opened.
Born: Don Raleigh, Canadian ice hockey player, in Kenora, Ontario (d. 2012)

Monday, June 28, 1926

King–Byng Affair: William Lyon Mackenzie King resigned as Prime Minister of Canada after the Governor General Julian Byng invoked his reserve power to refuse to sign the formal Order in Council to dissolve Parliament.
Born: Mel Brooks, American comedian and filmmaker; in Brooklyn, New York (alive in 2021)

Tuesday, June 29, 1926
Arthur Meighen of the Conservative Party became the Prime Minister of Canada for the second time.
Italy increased the working day by one hour as part of a nationwide efficiency drive.
Born: Jaber Al-Ahmad Al-Sabah, Emir of Kuwait, in Kuwait City (d. 2006)

Wednesday, June 30, 1926
French police thwarted a plot to assassinate King Alfonso XIII of Spain during his visit to France.
Robert Forke resigned as the leader of the Progressive Party of Canada.
English pilot Alan Cobham took off from the River Medway to begin a round-trip survey flight from England to Australia in his de Havilland seaplane.
Born: Paul Berg, American chemist and Nobel Prize in Chemistry laureate, in Brooklyn, New York (alive in 2021)

References

1926
1926-06
1926-06